José Ernani Palalia (born 12 March 1972) is a Mexican long-distance runner. He competed in the men's marathon at the 2004 Summer Olympics.

References

1972 births
Living people
Athletes (track and field) at the 2004 Summer Olympics
Mexican male long-distance runners
Mexican male marathon runners
Olympic athletes of Mexico
Place of birth missing (living people)
20th-century Mexican people